Yamani Esther Saied Calviño (born May 12, 1978, in Ciudad de Panamá Panamá) is a Panamanian model and beauty pageant contestant winner of the Señorita Panamá 1998. She also represented Panama in the Miss Universe 1999, the 48th Miss Universe. The pageant was held at Chaguaramas Convention Centre, Chaguaramas, Trinidad and Tobago on May 26, 1999.

She competed in the national beauty pageant Señorita Panamá 1998, on September, 1998 and obtained the title of Señorita Panamá Universo. She represented Panamá Centro state.

Her start in the modeling world took place when she joined the "Chica Modelo" (a model search) contest in 1996 where she won to his 15 years. She is also a recognized TV host in Panama.

References

External links
 Señorita Panamá  official website

1978 births
Living people
Miss Universe 1999 contestants
Panamanian beauty pageant winners
Señorita Panamá